Esterhuysen may refer to:

People 
 Anriette Esterhuysen (born 1953), South African computer networking pioneer and human rights defender
 Elsie Elizabeth Esterhuysen (1912–2006), South African botanist
 Richard Grant Esterhuysen, real name of Richard E. Grant (born 1957), British-Swazi actor

Science

Botany 
 Esterhuysenia, genus of flowering plants belonging to the family Aizoaceae, named in honor of Elsie Elizabeth Esterhuysen

Astronomy 
 11694 Esterhuysen, minor planet

See also